Marie-Anne Day Walker-Pelletier  (born April 15, 1954) is the Chief of the Okanese First Nation. Since becoming chief in 1981 she is the longest-serving female chief in Saskatchewan.

In July 2001, Walker-Pelletier was host of a healing conference included native leaders from across Canada. In 2005, she was Chair of the Federation of Saskatchewan Indian Nations.

She was named a Member of the Order of Canada in 2018 and a Member of the Saskatchewan Order of Merit in 2021.

References

Living people
Indigenous leaders in Saskatchewan
First Nations women in politics
Members of the Order of Canada
Members of the Saskatchewan Order of Merit
1954 births